The Moosic Mountains is a mountain range in northeastern Pennsylvania that stretches from Scranton to Mount Pleasant Township, a distance of roughly 32 miles.

References

Mountain ranges of Pennsylvania
Landforms of Lackawanna County, Pennsylvania